Operation Papillon was a large scale air and ground assault on the Viet Minh at Hòa Bình by the French Army and Air Force in April 1947, during the early stages of the First Indochina War.

Notes

References
Printed
 
 
 
 
 
 
 
 
 

1947 in French Indochina
1947 in Vietnam
Battles and operations of the First Indochina War
Military operations involving France
Battles involving Vietnam
Conflicts in 1947
April 1947 events in Asia
History of Hòa Bình Province